Lambertia is a genus of flowering plants, belonging to the family Proteaceae.  It is endemic to Australia.
The genus was named in 1798 by Sir James Edward Smith in honour of English botanist Aylmer Bourke Lambert.

The Lambertias are sclerophyllous shrubs or small trees.  The common name, wild honeysuckle, is due to the flowers, which are asymmetrical with a long floral tube and tightly rolled lobes, in red, orange, yellow and green.

Species
There are ten species, nine of which are endemic to the South West, and one, L. formosa, found in the Central Coast, Blue Mountains and Southern Highlands regions of New South Wales. They are as follows:

References

FloraBase - the Western Australian flora - Lambertia

 
Proteaceae genera
Endemic flora of Australia
Proteales of Australia